Gonzalo Domínguez (born 26 August 1925) was a Chilean alpine skier. He competed in two events at the 1948 Winter Olympics.

References

External links
 

1925 births
Possibly living people
Chilean male alpine skiers
Olympic alpine skiers of Chile
Alpine skiers at the 1948 Winter Olympics
Place of birth missing
20th-century Chilean people